It was formerly the law an excommunicated person was prohibited from every legal act, so that he or she could not act, nor sue any person, but he could be sued by others. Coke expounded this law in the following terms: .

References

Canon law of the Church of England